Seeing Hands is a 1943 American short film. It tells the story of Benjamin Charles Helwig, who was blinded in his late teens but became a valued employee at an American World War II manufacturing plant, machining and inspecting precision parts.  Directed by Gunther von Fritsch, the film was nominated for an Academy Award at the 16th Academy Awards for Best Short Subject (One-Reel).

Cast
 Barbara Bedford as Ben's Mother (uncredited)
 William Bishop as Man Pulling Lamp Cord (uncredited)
 Robert Frazer as John Downin (uncredited)
 Russell Gleason as adult Ben Helwig (uncredited)
 George 'Spanky' McFarland as "Fatty” leading initiation (uncredited)
 Pete Smith, narrator of short (uncredited)

References

External links
 
Find-a-grave. Benjamin Charles Helwig

1943 films
1943 drama films
1943 short films
American drama short films
American black-and-white films
Films directed by Gunther von Fritsch
1940s English-language films
1940s American films